The Pama–Nyungan languages are the most widespread family of Australian Aboriginal languages, containing 306 out of 400 Aboriginal languages in Australia. The name "Pama–Nyungan" is a merism: it is derived from the two end-points of the range, the Pama languages of northeast Australia (where the word for "man" is ) and the Nyungan languages of southwest Australia (where the word for "man" is ).

The other language families indigenous to the continent of Australia are occasionally referred to, by exclusion, as non-Pama–Nyungan languages, though this is not a taxonomic term. The Pama–Nyungan family accounts for most of the geographic spread, most of the Aboriginal population, and the greatest number of languages. Most of the Pama–Nyungan languages are spoken by small ethnic groups of hundreds of speakers or fewer. The vast majority of languages, either due to disease or elimination of their speakers, have become extinct, and almost all remaining ones are endangered in some way. Only in the central inland portions of the continent do Pama-Nyungan languages remain spoken vigorously by the entire community.

The Pama–Nyungan family was identified and named by Kenneth L. Hale, in his work on the classification of Native Australian languages.  Hale's research led him to the conclusion that of the Aboriginal Australian languages, one relatively closely interrelated family had spread and proliferated over most of the continent, while approximately a dozen other families were concentrated along the North coast.

Typology
Evans and McConvell describe typical Pama–Nyungan languages such as Warlpiri as dependent-marking and exclusively suffixing languages which lack gender, while noting that some non-Pama–Nyungan languages such as Tangkic share this typology and some Pama–Nyungan languages like Yanyuwa, a head-marking and prefixing language with a complicated gender system, diverge from it.

Reconstruction

Proto-Pama–Nyungan may have been spoken as recently as about 5,000 years ago, much more recently than the 40,000 to 60,000 years indigenous Australians are believed to have been inhabiting Australia. How the Pama–Nyungan languages spread over most of the continent and displaced any pre-Pama–Nyungan languages is uncertain; one possibility is that language could have been transferred from one group to another alongside culture and ritual. Given the relationship of cognates between groups, it seems that Pama-Nyungan has many of the characteristics of a sprachbund, indicating the antiquity of multiple waves of culture contact between groups. Dixon in particular has argued that the genealogical trees found with many language families do not fit in the Pama-Nyungan family.

Using computational phylogenetics, Bouckaert, et al. (2018) posit a mid-Holocene expansion of Pama-Nyungan from the Gulf Plains of northeastern Australia.

Phonotactics
Pama–Nyungan languages generally share several broad phonotactic constraints: single-consonant onsets, a lack of fricatives, and a prohibition against liquids (laterals and rhotics) beginning words. An exception is Kala Lagaw Ya, which acquired both fricatives and a voicing contrast in them and in its plosives from contact with Papuan languages.

Classification 
At the time of the European arrival in Australia, there were some 300 Pama–Nyungan languages divided across three dozen branches. What follows are the languages listed in Bowern (2011); numbers in parentheses are the numbers of languages in each branch. These vary from languages so distinct they are difficult to demonstrate as being in the same branch, to near dialects on par with the differences between the Scandinavian languages.

Traditional conservative classification
Down the east coast, from Cape York to the Bass Strait, there are:
Kala Lagaw Ya (1)
Paman (41)
Yidiny (1)
Dyirbalic (5)
Maric (26)
Waka–Kabic (5)
Durubulic (5)
Bandjalangic (4)
Gumbaynggiric (2)
Anewan (Nganyaywana) (1)
Wiradhuric (Central NSW; inland of Yuin–Kuric) (5)
Yuin–Kuric (14)
Gippsland (5)

Continuing along the south coast, from Melbourne to Perth:
Yotayotic (somewhat inland) (2)
Kulinic (13)
Lower Murray (9)
Thura-Yura (8)
Mirniny (2)
Nyungic (SW) (11)

Up the west coast:
Kartu (5)
Kanyara–Mantharta (8)
Ngayarta (12)
Marrngu (3)

Cutting inland back to Paman, south of the northern non-Pama–Nyungan languages, are
Ngumpin–Yapa (10)
Warumungu (1)
Warluwaric (5)
Kalkatungic (2)
Mayi (Mayabic) (7)

Encircled by these branches are:
Wati (15), the large inland expanse in the west
Arandic (9), in the north centre
Karnic (18), in the west
Yardli (Yarli) (3), in the west
Muruwari (1)
Baagandji (Darling; inland of Lower Murray) (2)

Separated to the north of the rest of Pama–Nyungan is
Yolŋu (10)

Some of inclusions in each branch are only provisional, as many languages became extinct before they could be adequately documented. Not included are dozens of poorly attested and extinct languages such as Barranbinja and the Lower Burdekin languages.

A few more inclusive groups that have been proposed, such as Northeast Pama–Nyungan (Pama–Maric), Central New South Wales, and Southwest Pama–Nyungan, appear to be geographical rather than genealogical groups.

Bowern & Atkinson
Bowern & Atkinson (2012) use computational phylogenetics to calculate the following classification:
 Southeastern
 Victorian
 Lower Murray languages
 Victorian
 Eastern Victoria
 Yorta-Yorta
 Gunai
 Pallanganmiddang
 Macro-Kulin
 Kulin languages
 Bungandidj
 New South Wales
 Yuin-Kuric languages
 Central New South Wales languages
 North Coast
Durubalic languages
Yugambeh-Bundjalung languages
 Gumbaynggiric languages
 Waka-Kabic languages
 Northern
 Gulf
 Kalkatungic languages
 Mayabic languages
 Pama-Maric (weak support)
 Paman languages
 Kalaw Lagaw Ya
 Maric languages
 (?) Dyirbalic languages
 Central
 Arandic–Thura-Yura
Arandic languages
Thura-Yura languages
Southwest Queensland
Karnic languages
Northwest NSW
Yarli
Paakantyi
 Western
 Yolŋu-Ngarna (weak support)
 Yolŋu languages
 Ngarna languages
 Nyungic languages
 Desert Nyungic
 Marrngu languages
Ngumpin–Yapa languages 
Warumungu languages
Wati languages
Southwest Nyungic
Pilbara languages
Ngayarda languages 
Kanyara-Mantharta languages
Kartu–Nhanda languages
Mirning languages
Nyunga languages
Yinggarda language

External relations
According to Nicholas Evans, the closest relative of Pama–Nyungan is the Garawan language family, followed by the small Tangkic family. He then proposes a more distant relationship with the Gunwinyguan languages in a macro-family he calls Macro-Pama–Nyungan. However, this has yet to be demonstrated to the satisfaction of the linguistic community.

Validity

Dixon's skepticism
In his 1980 attempt to reconstruct Proto-Australian, R. M. W. Dixon reported that he was unable to find anything that reliably set Pama–Nyungan apart as a valid genetic group. Fifteen years later, he had abandoned the idea that Australian or Pama–Nyungan were families. He now sees Australian as a Sprachbund (Dixon 2002). Some of the small traditionally Pama–Nyungan families which have been demonstrated through the comparative method, or which in Dixon's opinion are likely to be demonstrable, include the following:

North Cape York (Northern Paman, Umpila, Wik/Middle Paman: part of Paman)
Yidinic (Dyaabugai and Yidiny: rejected by Bowern)
Maric (extinct languages uncertain)
Wiradhuric
Yolngu
Ngarna, a clear connection between Yanyuwa and Warluwara, Wagaya, Yindjilandji, Bularnu.
Part of Yura

He believes that Lower Murray (five families and isolates), Arandic (2 families, Kaytetye and Arrernte), and Kalkatungic (2 isolates) are small Sprachbunds.

Dixon's theories of Australian Language diachrony have been based on a model of punctuated equilibrium (adapted from the eponymous model in evolutionary biology) wherein he believes Australian languages to be ancient and to have--for the most part--remained in unchanging equilibrium with the exception of sporadic branching or speciation events in the phylogenetic tree. Part of Dixon's objections to the Pama Nyungan family classification is the lack of obvious binary branching points which are implicitly or explicitly entailed by his model.

Mainstream rejoinders
However, the papers in Bowern & Koch (2004) demonstrate about ten traditional groups, including Pama–Nyungan, and its sub-branches such as Arandic, using the comparative method.

In his last published paper from the same collection, Ken Hale describes Dixon's skepticism as an erroneous phylogenetic assessment which is "so bizarrely faulted, and such an insult to the eminently successful practitioners of Comparative Method Linguistics in Australia, that it positively demands a decisive riposte."  In the same work Hale provides unique pronominal and grammatical evidence (with suppletion) as well as more than fifty basic-vocabulary cognates (showing regular sound correspondences)  between the proto-Northern-and-Middle Pamic (pNMP) family of the Cape York Peninsula on the Australian northeast coast and proto-Ngayarta of the Australian west coast, some 3,000 km apart, (as well as from many other languages) to support the Pama–Nyungan grouping, whose age he compares to that of Proto-Indo-European.

Bowern (2006) 
Bowern 2006 offers an alternative to Dixon's binary phylogenetic-tree model based in the principles of dialect geography. Rather than discarding the notion that multiple subgroups of languages are genetically related due to the presence of multiple dialectal epicenters arranged around stark isoglosses, Bowern proposes that the non-binary-branching characteristics of Pama Nyungan languages (note that Bowern & Atkinson 2012 uncovered more binary-branching characteristics than initially thought) are precisely what we would expect to see from a language continuum in which dialects are diverging linguistically but remaining in close geographic and social contact. Bowern offers three main advantages of this geographical-continuum model over the punctuated equilibrium model:

Bowern & Atkinson (2012) 
As mentioned above, additional methods of computational phylogenetic employed by Bowern and Atkinson in 2012 function as a different kind of rejoinder to Dixon's skepticism. Instead of acceding to the notion that Pama Nyungan languages do not share the characteristics of a binary-branching language family, the computational methods revealed that inter-language loan rates were not as atypically high as previously imagined and do not obscure the features that would allow for a phylogenetic approach. 

Bowern and Atkinson's computational model is currently the definitive model of Pama-Nyungan intra-relatedness and diachrony.

See also 
Macro-Pama–Nyungan languages

References

Bibliography

Claire Bowern & Harold Koch, eds. (2004) Australian Languages: Classification and the Comparative Method. John Benjamins Publishing Company.
Bowern, Claire, & Atkinson, Quentin. (2012). Computational Phylogenetics and the Internal Structure of Pama-Nyungan: Dataset [Data set]. Language. 
McConvell, Patrick and Nicholas Evans. (eds.) 1997. Archaeology and Linguistics: Global Perspectives on Ancient Australia. Melbourne: Oxford University Press
Dixon, R. M. W. 2002. Australian Languages: Their Nature and Development. Cambridge University Press
Evans, Nicholas. (eds.) 2003. The Non-Pama–Nyungan Languages of Northern Australia. Comparative studies of the continent's most linguistically complex region. Canberra: Pacific Linguistics

Data sets
Robert Forkel, Tiago Tresoldi, & Johann-Mattis List. (2019). lexibank/bowernpny: The Internal Structure of Pama-Nyungan (Version v3.0) [Data set]. Zenodo.

External links

Chirila – Yale Pama-Nyungan Lab
AIATSIS map of Australian languages

 
Language families
Indigenous Australian languages in New South Wales
Indigenous Australian languages in Victoria (Australia)
Indigenous Australian languages in Queensland
Indigenous Australian languages in South Australia